Sotagliflozin, sold under the brand name Zynquista, is a drug approved in the European Union for people with type 1 diabetes.

The most common side effect is genital infection in women. Other common side effects include diabetic ketoacidosis, diarrhoea and genital infection in men.

The US Food and Drug Administration (FDA) refused its approval for use in combination with insulin for the treatment of type 1 diabetes. It is developed by Lexicon Pharmaceuticals.

Sotagliflozin is a combination sodium/glucose cotransporter 1 and 2 (SGLT1/2) inhibitor and is in the class of drugs known as gliflozins.

References

External links 
 

SGLT2 inhibitors
Diabetes-related supplies and medical equipment